Rynne may refer to :

Frank Rynne is an Irish-born singer, record producer, art curator, filmmaker, writer, and historian. 
Padraig Rynne is an Irish musician and noted concertina player. 
William Rynne, known as "Willie" Rynne, was an Irish Republican who fought in the 1916 Rising.
Xavier Rynne is the pseudonym of Francis X. Murphy, a Redemptorist chaplain and theology professor who wrote about the Second Vatican Council.